Charles William Henderson (born August 26, 1948) is a retired Marine Corps Warrant Officer and an author based in Colorado.  Henderson is best known for his 2 biographies, Marine Sniper: 93 Confirmed Kills and Silent Warrior about Marine Corps Sniper Carlos Hathcock.

Biography
Henderson was born in Artesia, New Mexico in 1948 and attended Artesia High School, graduating in 1966. From 1968 to 1970 he was a reporter and sports editor for the Artesia Daily Press.  In May 1970, he enlisted in the United States Marine Corps as an Infantryman.  He served in Vietnam and Beirut, Lebanon.  He went on to serve in Public Affairs positions and as a journalist for the military.  He retired from the Marine Corps in 1993 as a Chief Warrant Officer.  In 1997, he accepted a position with the National Livestock Producers Association as Director of Commodities and Communications, retiring in 1999 to become a full-time writer.

Works
Marine Sniper: 93 Confirmed Kills, (1986); reissued as a paperback in 1988  
Marshalling the Faithful: The Marines' First Year in Vietnam, (1993)  
Silent Warrior, (Berkley Books, 2000)  
Goodnight Saigon, (2005)  
Jungle Rules: A True Story of Marine Justice in Vietnam, (2007)

Awards and honors
Life Member of Phi Kappa Phi Honor Society
The American Society of Journalists and Authors named Goodnight Saigon, as the Outstanding General Nonfiction Book for 2006.

References

External links
 Official Biography & Website

1948 births
Living people
American military writers
American military historians
American male non-fiction writers
Syracuse University alumni
United States Marines
United States Marine Corps personnel of the Vietnam War
Cameron University alumni
People from Artesia, New Mexico
Historians from New York (state)